The 2007 Philadelphia mayoral election was held on November 6, 2007 when Philadelphia, Pennsylvania, United States elected Michael Nutter as the Mayor of Philadelphia starting in 2008. The incumbent mayor, John F. Street was barred from seeking a third term because of term limits.  The Democratic Party primary campaign saw two well-known, well-funded Philadelphia congressmen – Bob Brady and Chaka Fattah – eclipsed by self-funding businessman Tom Knox and reformist former Philadelphia City Council member Nutter, who won by a surprisingly large margin in the primary election on May 15.  He went on to face Republican Party nominee Al Taubenberger in the general election, which he won by a large margin and with the lowest voter turnout in a Philadelphia mayoral election without an incumbent since 1951. Mayor Nutter was sworn in on January 7, 2008.

Background
The 2007 Philadelphia mayoral election was held to select the replacement for incumbent Mayor John F. Street, who was prevented from being re-elected a third time by term limits. Nearly four out of five Philadelphia voters are registered Democrats and the city has not elected a Republican mayor in close to sixty years.

Issues
The two major issues in the mayoral campaign were crime and corruption. Philadelphians felt crime was the most important issue because of the city's rising murder rate. There were more than 400 murders in 2006, the most in almost a decade. Corruption was also an important issue. A corruption probe resulted in the conviction a close to two dozen people, some with close ties to Mayor John F. Street. An early poll on issues concerning young adults, crime was the number one issue with public transit, economic development, education and job growth rounding out the top five.

Primary

Philadelphia City Council member Michael Nutter won the Democratic mayoral primary on May 15. His opponent, businessman Tom Knox came in second, with congressmen Bob Brady and Chaka Fattah and State Representative Dwight Evans coming in third, fourth, and fifth respectively. Al Taubenberger became the Republican nominee after running unopposed.

Businessman Tom Knox had started off strong as his self-financed campaign created a barrage of advertising. However, Michael Nutter's message of government reform and criticism of John Street gained him enough support to win the primary.

Election
On November 6, Michael Nutter easily won the mayoral election, receiving 83.4% of the vote to Taubenberger's 17.3%. The margin of victory is the largest since 1931. Nutter's margin of victory was so large the Associated Press declared a winner after just one percent of the vote was counted. Turnout in the election was light with only 28.7 percent of registered voters casting a ballot. The 2007 election had the lowest turnout in a Philadelphia mayoral election without an incumbent since the Home Rule Charter of 1951.

In the general election, the candidates for Mayor were:
Michael Nutter – A former Philadelphia City Councilman who left his seat in 2006 to run for mayor as a Democrat.
Al Taubenberger – The President of the Greater Northeast Philadelphia Chamber of Commerce who ran as a Republican.
John Staggs – A Germantown meat packer who ran as a member of the Socialist Workers Party.

In the general election, Michael Nutter became the odds-on favorite to win the election. Nutter raised US$2.9 million for his campaign while Taubenberger raised no more than US$20,000. The candidates held numerous joint appearances and had few disagreements. Towards the end of the race Taubenberger was advertising himself as the "super underdog" .

One of the most significant disagreements on issues the two candidates had was on Nutter's "stop and frisk" proposal. The proposal would allow police officers to stop and frisk people suspected of carrying illegal firearms. Taubenberger criticized the proposal, which was also criticized by Nutter's opponents in the primary and Police Commissioner Sylvester Johnson, saying the proposal could be abused and violate civil rights. Taubenberger proposed hiring more police officers to reduce the city's high murder rate.

Other disagreements dealt with the city's requirement that public employees live within the city, which Taubenberger proposed removing. Nutter said he would keep the rule, but would remove the restriction that allows only people who have lived in the city for at least one year to apply for city positions. Nutter and Taubenberger also disagreed on the city's decision to charge rent for the Cradle of Liberty Council as result of the Boy Scouts of America's policy on homosexuality which the city says violates its laws on discrimination. Nutter supported the decision saying his administration would not subsidize discrimination. Taubenberger said the decision was wrong because the Boy Scouts do too much good and keep kids off the streets.

Results

Polls

General election

Democratic primary

References

External links

The Next Mayor: an election website sponsored by Philadelphia Daily News, WHYY, and the Committee of 70.
Philadelphia Inquirer website on the race

2007 in Philadelphia
2007 Pennsylvania elections
Philadelphia
2007